Intelsat IVA F-2 was a geostationary communication satellite built by Hughes, it was owned by Intelsat. The satellite was based on the HS-353 platform and its estimated useful life was 7 years.

History 
The Intelsat IVA F-2 was part of the Intelsat IVA series which consisted of 6 satellites, of which five were successfully placed into orbit. All five satellites in the series were retired and operated an average of almost 4 years beyond their life expectancies. The satellite antenna allowed coverage from the land masses on both sides of the Atlantic basin with four point beams and had sufficient insulation between the east beams and the western beams that used the same frequencies in the east and west. The separation of the beam by directional antenna allowed this dual use of the frequency, significantly increasing the capacity of satellite communication within an assigned frequency range. Although the initial requirement Intelsat VAT series was only for the Atlantic service, but also was given special attention during the project to provide service on the Indian Ocean and Pacific Ocean.

The satellite had 20 transponders (individual radio transmitters) compared to 12 on board each Intelsat IV satellite. The solar panels, covered with about 17,000 solar cells, provided primary energy of 600 Watts.

The satellite was successfully launched into space on January 29, 1976, by means of an Atlas-Centaur vehicle from the Cape Canaveral Air Force Station, United States. It had a launch mass of 1,515 kg.

See also 
 Intelsat

References 

Spacecraft launched in 1976
Intelsat satellites